Lacey Morgan Hull (born August 21, 1986) is an American politician serving as a member of the Texas House of Representatives from the 138th district. Hull was first elected in November 2020 and assumed office in January 2021. She is a member of the Republican Party.

Background
Hull was born in Houston. She earned a Bachelor of Science degree in political science and history from the University of Houston. She served on her neighborhood homeowner association (HOA) and was a precinct chair for the Harris County Republican Party before being elected.

References

External links
 Campaign website
 State legislative page

1986 births
Living people
Republican Party members of the Texas House of Representatives
Women state legislators in Texas
University of Houston alumni
21st-century American politicians
21st-century American women politicians